Noahdendron is a monotypic genus of flowering plants belonging to the family Hamamelidaceae. The only species is Noahdendron nicholasii.

Its native range is Northeastern Queensland.

References

Hamamelidaceae
Monotypic Saxifragales genera